Copernicia molineti is a palm which is endemic to Cuba.

References

molineti
Trees of Cuba